KTDV is a radio station airing a contemporary Christian music format licensed to State Center, Iowa, broadcasting on 91.9 MHz FM.  The station serves the areas of Marshalltown, Iowa and Iowa Falls, Iowa, and is owned by Marshalltown Education Plus, Inc.

References

External links

Contemporary Christian radio stations in the United States
TDV